Daniel Murray (born 21 March 1996) is a professional rugby league footballer who plays as a  forward for the Halifax Panthers in the Betfred Championship.

Murray played for the Salford Red Devils in the Super League, and has spent time on loan from Salford at the Rochdale Hornets and Oldham (Heritage № 1397) in Kingstone Press League 1, the Bradford Bulls and Halifax in the Kingstone Press Championship and Hull Kingston Rovers in the Betfred Super League. He has also played for Hull KR on a permanent basis.

Background
Murray was born in Wigan, Greater Manchester, England.

Playing career

Bradford
He joined Bradford on a loan deal in February 2017.

Salford
In 2017, he made his début for Salford against Widnes in the Super League. He went onto make seven appearances for the Salford side.

Hull KR
Murray made 14 appearances for Hull KR.

Halifax
On 12 November 2020, it was announced that Murray would join Halifax permanently on a two-year deal from the 2021 season, having spent two previous spells with the West Yorkshire giants on loan and dual registration. He was part of the Panthers side that was 80 minutes from a Grand Final in 2021, narrowly losing out in the semi finals.

References

External links
Salford Red Devils profile
SL profile

1996 births
Living people
Bradford Bulls players
Halifax R.L.F.C. players
Hull Kingston Rovers players
Oldham R.L.F.C. players
Rochdale Hornets players
Rugby league players from Wigan
Rugby league props
Salford Red Devils players